McBroom is a surname. Notable people with the surname include:

 Amanda McBroom (born 1947), American singer, songwriter and cabaret performer
 Austin McBroom (born 1992), American YouTuber
 David Bruce (actor) (born Marden Andrew McBroom; 1914–1976), American film actor
 Durga McBroom (born 1962), American rock singer
 Ed (Edward W.) McBroom (born 1981), American politician
 Edward McBroom (1925–1990), American politician
 Kelly McBroom (born 1989), Canadian skier
 Michael McBroom (born 1991), American swimmer
 Pearl McBroom (1926–2004), American cardiologist
 Ryan McBroom (born 1992), American professional baseball player
 Stephen McBroom (born 1964), Australian rules footballer
 Tom McBroom (born 1952), Canadian golf course architect
 Troy McBroom (born 1983), American football wide receiver

See also
 Frances McBroom Thompson (1942–2014), American mathematics educator and textbook author
 John Keith McBroom Laird (1907–1985), author, barrister, and solicitor
 Shidler McBroom Gates and Lucas, a law firm which merged to form Preston Gates & Ellis